The Rotonda de los Hombres Ilustres is a dated named that may refer to:

 Rotonda de los Hombres Ilustres, Chihuahua City
 Rotonda de los Hombres Ilustres, the former name of the Rotonda de las Personas Ilustres at Panteón de Dolores, Mexico City
 Rotonda de los Hombres Ilustres, the former name of the Rotonda de los Jaliscienses Ilustres